Delaware's 11th Senate district is one of the 21 districts in the Delaware Senate. It has been represented by Democrat Bryan Townsend since 2012, following his defeat of incumbent Anthony DeLuca in the Democratic primary.

Geography
District 11 covers communities immediately to the east of Newark in New Castle County, including Brookside, Christiana, Woodshade, Taylortown, and some of Bear.

Like all districts in the state, the 11th Senate district is located entirely within Delaware's at-large congressional district. It overlaps with the 5th, 18th, 24th, and 26th districts of the Delaware House of Representatives.

Recent election results
Delaware Senators are elected to staggered four-year terms. Under normal circumstances, the 11th district holds elections in midterm years, except immediately after redistricting, when all seats are up for election regardless of usual cycle.

2022

2018

2014

2012

Federal and statewide results in District 11

References 

11
New Castle County, Delaware